Harold Buchanan McGiverin,  (August 4, 1870 – February 4, 1931) was a Canadian lawyer and politician.

Born in Hamilton, Ontario, the son of Lieutenant Colonel William McGiverin and Emma Caroline McGiverin (Councell), he was educated in Hamilton, at Upper Canada College and at Osgoode Hall. Called to the Ontario bar in 1893, McGiverin practised law in Ottawa. He was also president of the Crow's Nest Pass Coal Company. He was elected to the House of Commons of Canada for the City of Ottawa riding in the 1908 federal election. A Liberal, he was defeated in the 1911 election and again in the 1917 election. He was re-elected in the 1921 election. From 1924 to 1925, he was a Minister without Portfolio.

In 1898, he married Alice Maude, the daughter of Charles H. Mackintosh. He is the father of Harold Mackintosh McGiverin.

McGiverin was also a leading local cricketer. A fast bowler, he represented Canada in eight matches before spending 1893 in England playing for St Neots Cricket Club as a professional. Following his retirement from playing McGiverin served as president of the Canadian Cricket Association. In 1908, he was the Canadian member on the Olympic Games Committee. McGiverin was also captain and later president of the Ottawa Rough Riders. He died in Victoria, British Columbia at the age of 60.

References

Sources
 Adams, P. (2010) A history of Canadian cricket, lulu.com. .

1870 births
1931 deaths
Cricketers from Ontario
Liberal Party of Canada MPs
Members of the House of Commons of Canada from Ontario
Members of the King's Privy Council for Canada
Politicians from Hamilton, Ontario